A bell tower is a tower that contains one or more bells, or that is designed to hold bells even if it has none. Such a tower commonly serves as part of a Christian church, and will contain church bells, but there are also many secular bell towers, often part of a municipal building, an educational establishment, or a tower built specifically to house a carillon. Church bell towers often incorporate clocks, and secular towers usually do, as a public service.

The term campanile (also), deriving from the Italian campanile, which in turn derives from campana, meaning "bell", is synonymous with bell tower; though in English usage campanile tends to be used to refer to a free standing bell tower. A bell tower may also in some traditions be called a belfry, though this term may also refer specifically to the substructure that houses the bells and the ringers rather than the complete tower.

Purpose

Bells are rung from a tower to enable them to be heard at a distance. Church bells can signify the time for worshippers to go to church for a communal service, and can be an indication of the fixed times of daily Christian prayer, called the canonical hours, which number seven and are contained in breviaries. They are also rung on special occasions such as a wedding, or a funeral service. In some religious traditions they are used within the liturgy of the church service to signify to people that a particular part of the service has been reached.

A bell tower may have a single bell, or a collection of bells which are tuned to a common scale. They may be stationary and chimed, rung randomly by swinging through a small arc, or swung through a full circle to enable the high degree of control of English change ringing. They may house a carillon or chimes, in which the bells are sounded by hammers connected via cables to a keyboard. These can be found in many churches and secular buildings in Europe and America including college and university campuses.

A variety of electronic devices exist to simulate the sound of bells, but any substantial tower in which a considerable sum of money has been invested will generally have a real set of bells.

Some churches have an exconjuratory in the bell tower, a space where ceremonies were conducted to ward off weather-related calamities, like storms and excessive rain. The main bell tower of the Cathedral of Murcia has four.

The early Christians thus came to pray the Lord's Prayer at 9 am, 12 pm and 3 pm; as such, in Christianity, many Lutheran and Anglican churches ring their church bells from belltowers three times a day: in the morning, at noon and in the evening calling Christians to recite the Lord’s Prayer. Many Catholic Christian churches ring their bells thrice a day, at 6a.m., noon, and 6p.m., to call the faithful to recite the Angelus, a prayer recited in honour of the Incarnation of God. Oriental Orthodox Christians, such as Copts and Indians, use a breviary such as the Agpeya and Shehimo to pray the canonical hours seven times a day while facing in the eastward direction; church bells are tolled, especially in monasteries, to mark these seven fixed prayer times (cf. ).

The Christian tradition of the ringing of church bells from a belltower is analogous to Islamic tradition of the adhan (call to prayer) from a minaret.

Old bell towers which are no longer used for their original purpose may be kept for their historic or architectural value, though in countries with a strong campanological tradition they often continue to have the bells rung.

History

Europe
In 400 AD, Paulinus of Nola introduced church bells into the Christian Church. By the 11th century, bells housed in belltowers became commonplace.

Historic bell towers exist throughout Europe. The Irish round towers are thought to have functioned in part as bell towers. Famous medieval European examples include Bruges (Belfry of Bruges), Ypres (Cloth Hall, Ypres), Ghent (Belfry of Ghent).  Perhaps the most famous European free-standing bell tower, however, is the so-called "Leaning Tower of Pisa", which is the campanile of the Duomo di Pisa in Pisa, Italy. In 1999 thirty-two Belgian belfries were added to the UNESCO's list of World Heritage Sites. In 2005 this list was extended with one Belgian and twenty-three Northern French belfries and is since known as Belfries of Belgium and France. Most of these were attached to civil buildings, mainly city halls, as symbols of the greater power the cities in the region got in the Middle Ages; a small number of buildings not connected with a belfry, such as bell towers of—or with their—churches, also occur on this same list (details). In the Middle Ages, cities sometimes kept their important documents in belfries. Not all are on a large scale; the "bell" tower of Katúň, in Slovakia, is typical of the many more modest structures that were once common in country areas. Archaic wooden bell towers survive adjoining churches in Lithuania and as well as in some parts of Poland.

In Orthodox Eastern Europe bell ringing also have a strong cultural significance (Russian Orthodox bell ringing), and churches were constructed with bell towers (see also List of tall Orthodox Bell towers).

China
Bell towers (Chinese: Zhonglou, Japanese: Shōrō) are common in China and the countries of related cultures. They may appear both as part of a temple complex and as an independent civic building, often paired with a drum tower, as well as in local church buildings. Among the best known examples are the Bell Tower (Zhonglou) of Beijing and the Bell Tower of Xi'an.

Gallery

See also
Bell-gable
Clock tower
Conjuratory
Octagon on cube
Zvonnitsa

References and notes

External links

Belfries of Belgium and France, UNESCO World Heritage Centre entry
Les Beffrois - France, Belgique, Pays-Bas, blog describing several bell towers (in French)
 All Saints Bell Tower

Towers

Tower